The 2015 Western Michigan Broncos football team represented Western Michigan University (WMU) in the 2015 NCAA Division I FBS football season. They were led by third-year head coach P. J. Fleck and played their home games at Waldo Stadium as a member of the West Division of the Mid-American Conference (MAC).

Previous season
In 2014, the Broncos finished the season 8–5, 6–2 in MAC play to finish in third place in the West Division. They were invited to the Famous Idaho Potato Bowl where they lost to Air Force.

Schedule

Schedule source:

Game summaries

Ball State
WMU defeated Ball State 54–7 in a mid-week MACtion game nationally televised on CBS Sports Network. In the game, the Broncos gained a school-record 711 yards of total offense. Western Michigan with a 5–0 in conference games were in first place in the West Division.

Awards

Conference Players of the Week
Four WMU football players have won five conference player of the week awards. Sophomore kickoff returner Darius Phillips has won two, and redshirt freshman running back Jamauri Bogan, sophomore linebacker Robert Spillane and junior quarterback Zach Terrell have each won one.

Jamauri Bogan
Bogan won the MAC West Offensive Player of the Week award for Week 7. He ran the ball nine times for 135 yards and two touchdowns in a 49–14 win over Ohio. In the game, WMU as a team rushed for 430 yards, with 404 of those coming in the second half.

Darius Phillips
Phillips was named MAC West Special Teams Player of the Week for Week 1 and 6. In Week 1, he returned four kickoffs for 185 yards, including a touchdown on a 100-yard kick off return in a loss to No. 5 Michigan State University. In Week 6. Phillips had two kick returns for 101 yards in WMU's 41–39 victory over rival Central Michigan.

Robert Spillane
Spillane was named MAC West Defensive Player of the Week for Week 8. Spillane had 9 total tackles and 3 for loss (including 1 sacks) in a 35–13 win over Miami (Ohio).

Zach Terrell
Zach Terrell was named MAC West Offensive Player of the Week for Week 9. He was 17 of 23 passing for 252 yards and ran for a team-high 71 yards in a 58–28 win over Eastern Michigan. He also rushed for one touchdown. The 71 yards rushing were a career-high.

Coaching staff
The following table lists the team's coaching staff.

References

Western Michigan
Western Michigan Broncos football seasons
Bahamas Bowl champion seasons
Western Michigan Broncos football